The Battle of Pachgaon was fought on 26 January 1775 for accession to the throne of the Nagpur Kingdom in central India. Mudhoji Bhonsle killed his brother and rival Sabaji, securing the undisputed regency for Mudhoji's infant son Raghoji II. The battle ended a struggle begun when their brother, the ruler Janoji Bhonsle, died in 1772 after adopting Raghoji II as his heir.

The battle occurred six miles south of Nagpur in modern-day Maharashtra, India. The fortune of the day had declared for Sabaji, and Mudhoji was surrounded by his brother's troops. Flushed with the fight and his apparent victory, Sabaji drove his elephant against his brother's, and called on him to surrender. Mudhoji replied with a pistol shot, killing Sadhoji and gaining the undisputed regency on behalf of his infant son Raghoji II, Janoji's adopted heir, and the title of Sena Dhurandhar.

Muhammad Yusuf Gardi, a chief assassin of the Maratha leader Narayanrao in 1773, fought for Mudhoji.

References

Panchgaon
Panchgaon
1775 in India
History of Nagpur